The 1981 Memphis State Tigers football team represented Memphis State University (now known as the University of Memphis) as an independent during the 1981 NCAA Division I-A football season. In its first season under head coach Rex Dockery, the team compiled a 1–10 record and was outscored by a total of 209 to 82. The team played its home games at Liberty Bowl Memorial Stadium in Memphis, Tennessee. 

The team's statistical leaders included Tom Smith with 466 passing yards, Tony Wiley with 497 rushing yards, Jerry Knowlton with 244 receiving yards, and Greg Hauss with 23 points scored.

Schedule

References

Memphis State
Memphis Tigers football seasons
Memphis State Tigers football